André Juillard (born 9 June 1948) is a French comic book creator.

Biography
Born in Paris, Juillard is one of the most prolific artists of historical comics in France. His career began in 1974. After studies in the School of Decorative Arts of Paris (l'école des Arts décoratifs de Paris), Juillard started in the popular magazine Formule 1, drawing La Longue Piste de Loup Gris, a Western story with scenario by Claude Verrien. He then adapted Roméo et Juliette for the magazine Djin. In 1976, he began his first long series, featuring the knight Bohémond de Saint-Gilles, based on a text written by Claude Verrien, published in Formule 1. During this period he also started Isabelle Fantouri based on texts by Josselin, for Djin, as well as Les Cathares with Didier Conrad for the same publication.

Bibliography 
Bohémond de Saint Gilles (1979–1983)
Les chevaliers du désert
Sortilèges à Malte
Duel en Sicile
L'or des croisés
Cheminot (1982)
Les Cathares (1982)
Arno (1983–1997)
Le pique rouge
L'oeil de Kéops
Le puits nubien
18 Brumaire
L'ogresse
Chesapeake

Les Sept vies de l'Epervier (1983–1991)
La blanche morte
Le temps des chiens
L'arbre de mai
Hyronimus
Le maître des oiseaux
La part du diable
La marque du Condor
Chasseurs d'or (1987)
Masquerouge (1988–2004)
Le Cahier bleu (1994)
Plume aux vents (1995–2002)
La folle et l'assassin
L'oiseau-tonnerre
Beau-Ténébreux
Ni Dieu ni diable
Après la pluie (1998)

Awards
 1995: Award for Best Comic Book at the Angoulême International Comics Festival, France
 1996: Grand Prix de la ville d'Angoulême, France
 1997: nominated for Best Cover at the Haxtur Awards, Spain
 2000: Best Short Comic Strip at the Haxtur Awards
 - nomination for the Harvey Award for Best American Edition of Foreign Material, U.S.
 2006: nominated for the Grand Prix Saint-Michel, Belgium
 2007: nominated for the Grand Prix Saint-Michel, Belgium

References

 André Juillard publications in (A SUIVRE) and Circus & Vécu BDoubliées 
 André Juillard albums Bedetheque  

Footnotes

External links
André Juillard biography on Lambiek Comiclopedia
André Juillard biography on BD d'Amiens 

French comics artists
Artists from Paris
Living people
1948 births
Grand Prix de la ville d'Angoulême winners